John McNichols may refer to:
 John P. McNichols, president of University of Detroit 
 John J. McNichols, member of the Illinois House of Representatives